Sir Walter Parratt  (10 February 184127 March 1924) was an English organist and composer.

Biography
Born in Huddersfield, son of a parish organist, Parratt began to play the pipe organ from an early age, and held posts as an organist while still a child.  He was a child prodigy: on one occasion he played Bach's complete The Well-Tempered Clavier by heart, without notice, at age ten.

From 1854 to 1861 he was an organist at St Paul's Church in his native town and, as successor to John Stainer, in 1872 at Magdalen College, Oxford, where he remained for ten years. From 1882 he held the post of organist of St. George's Chapel, Windsor Castle. He became Heather Professor of Music at Oxford University in 1908, taking over from Hubert Parry.

He became one of the foremost organ teachers of his day, with many important posts in Britain being filled by his students. He was president of the Royal College of Organists.

Parratt was also a distinguished chess player, and was able to simultaneously play chess and a complex organ piece—at first sight. He served for a few months as president of the Oxford University Chess Club and for two years was captain of the eight chosen to play against Cambridge.

Honours
He was knighted in 1892.  In 1893 he was appointed Master of the Queen's Musick to Queen Victoria, and afterward held the same office under Kings Edward VII and George V.

Later honours included: Member (MVO, 1901), Commander (CVO, 1917), and Knight Commander (KCVO, 1921) of the Royal Victorian Order.

After Parratt's death in 1924 a monument to him was erected in the grounds of Huddersfield Parish Church. There is also a monument to him in St George's Chapel, Windsor Castle, next to the entrance to King George VI Memorial Chapel where King George VI and the Queen Mother, and Queen Elizabeth II and the Prince Philip, Duke of Edinburgh are buried.

Appointments
Armitage Bridge Church, 1852-1854
St. Paul's Church, Huddersfield, 1854-1861 
private organist to the Earl of Dudley, Witley Court, 1861-1868 
organist of Wigan Parish Church, 1868-1872 
Magdalen College, Oxford, 1872-1882 
St. George's Chapel, Windsor Castle 1882-1924

See also
 Malcolm Boyle

Notes

References
Rosemary Firman, 'Parratt, Sir Walter (1841–1924)', Oxford Dictionary of National Biography, Oxford University Press, 2004 accessed 25 March 2008
Donald Tovey & Geoffrey Parratt, Walter Parratt: Master Of The Music (Oxford University Press, 1941).
 Organ Recitals at St George's Chapel

External links

1841 births
1924 deaths
English composers
English classical organists
British male organists
Masters of the Queen's Music
Musicians from Huddersfield
Knights Bachelor
Composers awarded knighthoods
Musicians awarded knighthoods
Knights Commander of the Royal Victorian Order
Fellows of Magdalen College, Oxford
Heather Professors of Music
Masters of the King's Music
Male classical organists